The Indre is a  long river in central France, a left tributary to the Loire.

Its source is in the department of Cher, near Préveranges. It flows through the departments of Cher, Indre and Indre-et-Loire. It flows generally northwest, through the communes of La Châtre, Châteauroux and Loches.

It joins the Loire near the site of the Chinon nuclear power plant, north of Avoine.

Its main tributary is the Indrois, which joins at Azay-sur-Indre. A smaller tributary is the Trégonce.

Departments and towns along the river:
 Cher 
 Indre: La Châtre, Châteauroux
 Indre-et-Loire: Loches

References

Rivers of France
Rivers of Cher (department)
Rivers of Indre
Rivers of Indre-et-Loire
Rivers of Centre-Val de Loire